Amund Skiri (born 25 February 1978) is a Norwegian former footballer that played for Åndalsnes before he played for Aalesund and Vålerenga in Norwegian Premier League. He's known for putting away the deciding penalty kick in the Norwegian cup final in 2009, giving Aalesund the victory and the medal. On 1 January 2017 he became assistant coach for Vålerenga.

Career statistics

References

External links
 Profile at Aafk.no
 Guardian Football

1978 births
Living people
Footballers from Oslo
Association football defenders
Norwegian footballers
Vålerenga Fotball players
Aalesunds FK players
Eliteserien players